The Kanpur Central–Kasganj Express is an Express train belonging to North Eastern Railway zone that runs between  and  in India. It is currently being operated with 15037/15038 train numbers on a daily basis.

Service

The 15037/Kanpur–Kasganj Express has an average speed of 42 km/hr and covers 247 km in 5h 55m. The 15038/Kasganj–Kanpur Express has an average speed of 42 km/hr and covers 247 km in 5h 55m.

Route and halts 

The important halts of the train are:

Coach composition

The train has standard ICF rakes with max speed of 110 kmph. The train consists of 12 coaches:

 10 General Unreserved
 2 Seating cum Luggage Rake

Traction

Both trains are hauled by an Izzatnagar Loco Shed-based WDM-3D diesel locomotive from Kanpur to Kasganj and vice versa.

See also 

 Kanpur Central railway station
 Kasganj Junction railway station
 Farrukhabad–Kasganj Express

Notes

References

External links 

 15037/Kanpur–Kasganj Express
 15038/Kasganj–Kanpur Express

Trains from Kanpur
Express trains in India
Kasganj